The Bishop of Beverley is a Church of England suffragan bishop. The title takes its name after the town of Beverley in the East Riding of Yorkshire, England.

The suffragan bishop was originally to assist the Archbishop of York in overseeing the Diocese of York, but after 1923 the position fell into abeyance. The See was revived under the Suffragans Nomination Act 1888 by Order in Council dated 8 February 1994, as a Provincial Episcopal Visitor for the Province of York. The bishop has responsibility for those parishes in 9 dioceses of the province who cannot in good conscience accept the sacramental ministry of bishops who have participated in the ordination of women. , three of the twelve dioceses in the northern province provide a different suffragan bishop to such parishes in their diocese: in the Diocese of Leeds this is the Bishop of Wakefield, and in Blackburn and Carlisle the Bishop of Burnley.

The bishop's office is in Micklegate, York.

The See was vacant since Bishop Glyn Webster's retirement; in the vacancy, the Bishop suffragan of Burnley had undertaken duties in the west of the province and the area Bishop of Wakefield in the east. In October 2022, it was announced that Stephen Peter Race would be the next Bishop of Beverley: his consecration took place on 30 November 2022 at York Minister.

List of bishops

See also

 Bishop of Ebbsfleet
 Bishop of Fulham
 Bishop of Richborough
 List of Anglo-Catholic churches in England

References

External links
 Official website
 Crockford's Clerical Directory listings